Perdix (Ancient Greek: Πέρδιξ means "partridge") was a nephew and student of Daedalus in Greek mythology. In other sources, Perdix was the mother of Talos or Attalus, and sister of Daedalus.

Mythology

Daedalus was so proud of his achievements that he could not bear the idea of a rival. His sister Perdix, had placed her son (variously named Perdix, Talos, or Calos) under his charge to be taught the mechanical arts. He was an apt scholar and showed striking evidence of ingenuity. While walking on the seashore, he picked up the spine of a fish or a serpent's jaw. Imitating it, he took a piece of iron and notched it on the edge, thus inventing the saw. He made a pair of compasses by putting two pieces of iron together, connecting them at one end with a rivet, and sharpening the other ends. 

Daedalus was so envious of his nephew's accomplishments that he took an opportunity, when they were together one day on the top of a high tower, to push him off, but Athena, who favors ingenuity, saw him falling and arrested his fate by changing him into a bird called after his name, the perdix (partridge). This bird does not build its nest in the trees, nor take lofty flights, but nestles in the hedges, and mindful of his fall, avoids high places. For this crime, Daedalus was tried and banished.  In some accounts, Athena leaves Daedalus with a scar in the shape of a partridge, to remind him of what he did.

Perdix is mentioned in book VIII (236-59) of Ovid's Metamorphoses.

Notes

References 

 John Tzetzes, Book of Histories, Book I translated by Ana Untila from the original Greek of T. Kiessling's edition of 1826. Online version at theio.com

 Smith, William; Dictionary of Greek and Roman Biography and Mythology, London (1873). "Perdix" 

Metamorphoses into birds in Greek mythology

Characters in Greek mythology
Metamorphoses characters
Deeds of Athena